Zaruhi Kalemkaryan (July 18, 1871 or 1874 in Constantinople, Ottoman Empire – July, 1971 in New York, New York) was a prose writer, essayist, poet, and philanthropist of Armenian descent.

Life 

Zaruhi Kalemkaryan was born Zaruhi Seferian on the Asiatic side of Constantinople's Bosphorus to Aşod Seferyan and her mother Peruze Demircibaşyan. She attended the local Aramian Armenian School and started her early experiments with poetry at school. She married Mihran Kalemkaryan in 1889, who was a member of the Ottoman Army. She began publishing under the pen names Yevterpe, and after her marriage G. Zaruhi. She contributed to Mari Beylerian's newspaper Artemis. After the Armenian Genocide, she assisted in the relief effort of the genocide survivors, especially children. She also contributed to the Armenian feminist journal Hay Gin. During this time, she published numerous poems in Constantinople and continued in the United States. She settled in New York City and was involved in many philanthropic and charitable foundations for the Armenian community. She was one of the first women members of AGBU (Armenian General Benevolent Union). In 1971, she died at the age of 97.

Works 
 Zartonk (The Awakening) – 1893: Poetry
 Tornigis Kirke (My Grandchildren's Book) – 1936: Travel Book
 Gyankis Jampen (My Life's Road) – 1952: Memoir
 Orer yev Temker (Days and Faces) – 1965

References 

1871 births
1971 deaths
American women poets
Armenian-language writers
19th-century American poets
20th-century American poets
Writers from Istanbul
Armenians from the Ottoman Empire
Emigrants from the Ottoman Empire to the United States
American feminists
Armenian-language women poets
Armenian-language poets
20th-century American women writers
19th-century American women writers
Armenian feminists